Wieniawa may refer to:

 Wieniawa, Masovian Voivodeship, east-central Poland
 Wieniawa Commune, Masovian Voivodeship, in east-central Poland
 Bolesław Wieniawa-Długoszowski (1881–1942), Polish General
 Henryk Wieniawski (1835–1880), Polish violinist and composer
 Julia Wieniawa (born 1998), Polish pop singer and actress

See also
 
 Wieniawski (disambiguation)